Preston is a rural locality split between the Toowoomba Region and the Lockyer Valley Region in Queensland, Australia. In the  Preston had a population of 614 people.

Geography 
Preston is located to the south-east of Toowoomba and to the east of Hodgson Vale.

History 
Prestons Provisional School opened in 1896. It became Prestons State School on 1 Jan 1909. In 1925 due to low student numbers, it initially became a half time school in conjunction with Eton Vale State School (a teacher was shared between the two schools) but then closed later in 1925. In April 1930 the school reopened with a slightly changed name Preston State School. It finally closed in 1947. The school was located approximately at 13 Nass Road.

In 2006 St David's Anglican Church was relocated from Oman Ama to 330 Preston Boundary Road in Preston, where it is used as a wedding chapel at Preston Manor & Village Chapel.  The church was dedicated on 31 July 1905 in Oman Ama. It closed in 1972 but reopened on 28 July 1985. Its final closure on 30 July 2002 was approved by Assistant Bishop Nolan.

In the  Preston had a population of 614 people.

Community groups 
The Middle Ridge branch of the Queensland Country Women's Association meets at 95 Preston-Boundary Road.

References

Further reading 
 

Suburbs of Toowoomba
Localities in Queensland
Lockyer Valley Region